The 2022–23 Scottish Women's Premier League is the 22nd season of the SWPL, the highest division of women's football in Scotland since 2002. The league is split into two divisions – SWPL 1 with 12 clubs and SWPL 2 with eight clubs. Both divisions were enlarged after the 2021–22 season (from ten and seven clubs respectively).

Rangers are the defending champions, after winning their first women's Scottish title in 2021–22 by beating the 15-time champions Glasgow City. Dundee United and Glasgow Women won promotion to SWPL 1. Montrose, Gartcairn and East Fife won promotion to SWPL 2 as the top three clubs in the SWF Championship in 2021–22.

In February 2022, a majority of SWPL clubs voted to leave the Scottish Women's Football association (under the auspices of the Scottish Football Association); from 2022–23 onwards, the two divisions will be administered by the Scottish Professional Football League.

A 12-club "split" format is returning in SWPL 1 in 2022–23, with a double round-robin before the "split", then another double round-robin of the top six and bottom six clubs respectively. The Women's Premier League previously used a "split" format between the 2012 and 2015 seasons. In SWPL 2, the eight clubs will simply play each other four times. The top club in SWPL 2 will win automatic promotion, the 12th-placed club in SWPL 1 will be relegated, and a promotion/relegation play-off will take place between the clubs finishing 11th in SWPL 1 and 2nd in SWPL 2. The league season began on 7 August 2022 and is scheduled to end on 21 May 2023.

Teams

SWPL 1

SWPL 2

SWPL 1

Regular season

Top six

Bottom six

SWPL 2

League table

References

Scot
Scottish Women's Premier League seasons
Premier League